, most often called in Japanese and sometimes in English , was a type of matchlock-configured arquebus firearm introduced to Japan through the Portuguese Empire in 1543.  were used by the samurai class and their  "foot soldiers", and within a few years the introduction of the  in battle changed the way war was fought in Japan forever. After Tokugawa Ieyasu destroyed the Toyotomi clan in the siege of Osaka and established the Tokugawa shogunate, the relatively peaceful Edo period arrived, and the use of   declined.

History

Origins
The  seems to have been based on snap matchlocks that were produced in the armory of Goa in Portuguese India, which was captured by the Portuguese in 1510. The name  came from the Japanese island (Tanegashima) where a Chinese junk with two Portuguese adventurers on board was driven to anchor by a storm in 1543. The lord of the Japanese island, Tanegashima Tokitaka (1528–1579), purchased two matchlock muskets from the Portuguese and put a swordsmith to work copying the matchlock barrel and firing mechanism. The smith, Yaita Kinbee Kiyosoda, did not have much of a problem with most of the gun but "drilling the barrel helically so that the screw ( bolt) could be tightly inserted" was a major problem as this "technique did not apparently exist in Japan until this time." The Portuguese fixed their ship and left the island and only in the next year when a Portuguese blacksmith was brought back to Japan was the problem solved. Within ten years of its introduction, over 300,000  firearms were reported to have been manufactured.

Sengoku period

Much of Japan was involved with internecine wars during the Sengoku period (1467–1603), as feudal lords vied for supremacy. Matchlock guns were introduced midway through the period and saw extensive use in the later years of the conflict, playing a decisive role on the battlefield. In 1549, Oda Nobunaga ordered 500 guns to be produced for his armies at a time when the benefits of firearms over traditional weapons were still relatively questionable to other . However the new firearm had undoubted advantages in range in comparison with traditional bows. In addition, bullets could penetrate almost any armor and shield. Joseon official Ryu Seong-ryong quoted:

But a significant drawback was the high price of each musket and the long production time. Ryu Seong-ryong:

The Japanese soon worked on various techniques to improve the effectiveness of their guns. They developed a staggered firing technique to create a continuous rain of bullets on the enemy. They also developed larger caliber barrels and ammunition to increase lethality. Protective boxes in lacquerware were invented to fit over the firing mechanism so it could still fire while it was raining, as were systems to accurately fire weapons at night by keeping fixed angles thanks to measured strings. A hollow tube open at both ends, the  contained gunpowder, wadding, and a bullet. Upon tearing open the tube's paper seal at the bottom, a soldier could quickly use it to pour the necessary powder into his weapon before placing over the barrel and using his rammer to load both wadding and bullet into the barrel at the same time. After use, the  could be kept for repacking or discarded.

In 1567, Takeda Shingen announced that, "Hereafter, the guns will be the most important arms, therefore decrease the number of spears per unit, and have your most capable men carry guns". Oda Nobunaga used tanegashima in the Battle of Anegawa (1570), and again against the powerful Takeda clan in the Battle of Nagashino (1575), 3,000 gunners helped win the battle, firing by volleys of a thousand at a time. They were concealed across a river and used breastworks to effectively stop enemy infantry and cavalry charges while being protected. The defeat of the powerful Takeda clan brought about permanent changes in battle tactics.

Japan became so enthusiastic about the new weapons that it possibly overtook every European country in absolute numbers produced. Japan also used the guns in the Japanese invasion of Korea in 1592, in which about a quarter of the invasion force of 160,000 were gunners. They were extremely successful at first and managed to capture Seoul just 18 days after their landing at Busan.

Edo period

The internal war for control of Japan was won by Tokugawa Ieyasu, who defeated his rivals at the Battle of Sekigahara in October 1600. Three years later, he established the Tokugawa shogunate, a powerful entity that would maintain peace, stability, and prosperity in Japan for the following 250 years. This is known as the Edo period (1603–1868). Contrary to popular belief, this did not lead to Japan "giving up the gun"; if anything, the gun was used less frequently because the Edo period did not have many large-scale conflicts in which a gun would be of use. Often the katana was simply the more practical weapon in the average small-scale conflicts.

Isolation did not eliminate the production of guns in Japan—on the contrary, there is evidence of around 200 gunsmiths in Japan by the end of the Edo period. However, the social life of firearms had changed: as the historian David L. Howell has argued, for many in Japanese society, the gun had become less a weapon than a farm implement for scaring off animals.

The arrival in Japan of the United States Navy led by Matthew C. Perry in 1854 started a period of rearmament. The  was an antiquated weapon by the 1800s and various samurai factions acquired advanced firearms including the minié rifle, breech-loading and repeating rifles. The samurai era ended in 1868 with the Meiji period; Japan turned to a national conscription army with modern weapons and uniforms. Some gunsmiths did replace their matchlock-type  into percussion cap mechanisms while retaining its design as a musket. The last use of samurai armour and traditional weapons in Japan, including , was during the Satsuma Rebellion (1877), when the Meiji government's newly established Imperial Japanese Army put an end to the last samurai and their resistance to modernization.

Classifications of different guns

Japanese arquebuses are classified by the location of their native gunsmiths as well as with the weight of the ball by momme.

(numbered cylinder)

(small cylinder)

They were occasionally used for self-defense by high ranking commanders.

(middle cylinder)

At the advent of firearms, Japanese armies had to come up with reliable ways of repelling the widespread use of guns; whether it would be the creation of metal and soon bullet-proof armor, standing bamboo bundles tied together or heavy iron pavises.

(great cylinder)

Guns of the  caliber (20 momme (≈ 75 g) and more) were practically portable hand cannons and were used as siege weapons employed to knock down the hinges of gates as well as powerful anti-personnel and anti-cavalry weapons.

A gun of this size was typically hard to operate (though varying on the momme), requiring plentiful amounts of gunpowder and proper training. One of the issues of operating such device was the powerful recoil and the difficulty of transporting, where sometimes larger  were either rested on rice bales, hang from trees using ropes, or have it installed on a carriage (similar to European cannons).

Samurai- (samurai cylinder)

(loop hole/hole cylinder)

These guns were used on castles and ships primarily as long range defensive weapons.

(horse riding cylinder)

(target cylinder)

 were made purely for the purpose of target practice.

Modern use

Today  are readily available from sellers of antique firearms and dealers of samurai antiques both in Japan and the West.

Parts

 – Butt protector
 – Trigger
 – Lock
 – Plate
 – Trigger guard
 – Rivet
 – Hole for the matchcord
 – Spring
 – Stock ring
 – Hammer arm
 – Barrel protector
 – Pancover
 – Pantray
 – Stock
 – Barrel
 – Rear sight
 – Sling hole
 – Middle sight
 – Pin hole
 – Front sight
 – Ramrod
 – Muzzle

Gallery

See also
Nanban trade period
Java arquebus
Istinggar
Jiaozhi arquebus

References

Further reading
 Tanegashima: the arrival of Europe in Japan, Olof G. Lidin, Nordic Institute of Asian Studies, NIAS Press, 2002
 The bewitched gun : the introduction of the firearm in the Far East by the Portuguese, by Rainer Daehnhardt 1994 
 The Japanese matchlock (in English), color printing, 60 pages, Shigeo Sugawa
  Giving up the gun: Japan's reversion to the sword, 1543-1879, Noel Perrin, David R. Godine Publisher, 1979

External links

 The varieties of Japanese matchlock.
  information.
  accessories
 Parts of the 
 Matsumoto Castle Gun Corps

Samurai weapons and equipment
Early firearms
Muskets
Firearms of Japan
Japan–Portugal relations
Gun politics in Japan
Japanese words and phrases